San Pietro Mussolino is a town in the province of Vicenza, Veneto, Italy. SP31 and SP44 goes through it.

Sources

(Google Maps)

Cities and towns in Veneto